Downey Corner is an unincorporated community in Cass Township, Ohio County, in the U.S. state of Indiana.

Geography

References

Unincorporated communities in Ohio County, Indiana
Unincorporated communities in Indiana